Founded in 1886, Weems is an unincorporated community and census-designated place (CDP) in Lancaster County in the U. S. state of Virginia. It was first drawn as a CDP prior to the 2020 census.

Christ Church, physically located in Weems, was designated a National Historic Landmark in 1961.  Corotoman was listed on the National Register of Historic Places in 1970.

The community is in southern Lancaster County, at the end of Virginia State Route 222 (Weems Road) on the north bank of the tidal Rappahannock River, where it is joined by Carter Creek. Aside from its historical significance as described above, Weems is a small, mostly residential community, but does operate waterside businesses and is a popular seaman's spot for berthing or entering Chesapeake Bay. Its majority of residents are middle aged to retirement age (45–80).

References

Further reading
 Jett, Carolyn H. (2003), Lancaster County, Virginia: Where the River Meets the Bay. Lancaster County History Book Committee.
 Berkeley, E., Jr., & the Dictionary of Virginia Biography, "Robert Carter (c. 1664–1732)". In Encyclopedia Virginia (2013). 
 Malmquist, David (April 30, 2019), "VIMS Christens RV Virginia". Virginia Institute of Marine Science.

External links 
 Weems community website

Unincorporated communities in Virginia
Unincorporated communities in Lancaster County, Virginia
Census-designated places in Virginia
Census-designated places in Lancaster County, Virginia